Kostya Kennedy is an American journalist and author. He is an editorial director at Dotdash Meredith, and a former senior writer and assistant managing editor at Sports Illustrated. Kennedy has written several-best selling books. His latest book, True: The Four Seasons of Jackie Robinson, is to be published in April 2022, by St. Martin's Press.  Before joining SI, Kennedy was a staff writer at Newsday and contributed to The New York Times and The New Yorker.

Biography
Originally from Great Neck, New York, Kennedy graduated with a BA in Philosophy from Stony Brook University in 1990 and from the Columbia University Graduate School of Journalism in 1992, where he was awarded the distinctive Pulitzer Traveling Fellowship.

Career
As editorial director of Dotdash Meredith Premium Publishing, Kennedy oversees special editions across a wide range of subject areas under numerous brands. These include LIFE, People, EatingWell, Real Simple, Entertainment Weekly and Health, as well as editions created with partners including the Los Angeles Times, History Channel, ESPN and many others.

At Sports Illustrated, along with writing columns, features and cover stories, Kennedy helped found and develop several departments, including "SI Players" and "SI Adventure" and he served as the top editor of Sports Illustrated Presents, overseeing special print and digital issues devoted to the commemoration of milestones in sports. 

A contributor and commentator on sports talk radio as well as on television for MSNBC and other networks, Kennedy has appeared on Late Night with Seth Meyers, Charlie Rose, Morning Joe and other news entertainment programs. He occasionally hosts public speaking engagements focusing on issues and ethics in sports.

In 2015 and 2016 Kennedy held a visiting professorship at New York University's Tisch Institute for Sports Management, Media and Business. He previously taught journalism at NYU and Columbia University.

Books and awards
Kennedy is the author of 56: Joe DiMaggio and the Last Magic Number in Sports (2011) which was named "the best baseball book to appear in many a season," by Roger Kahn. And Pete Rose: An American Dilemma (2014), described this way by the novelist Richard Ford: "Like the best writing about sport–Liebling, Angell–it qualifies as stirring literature." For both books, Kennedy earned the Casey Award for Best Baseball Book of the Year. Each was a New York Times Bestseller.
 
His book on Rose, along with other pieces and appearances by Kennedy, including a 2014 New York Times Op-Ed piece, have played a significant role in the renewed discussion about Rose’s eligibility for the National Baseball Hall of Fame.

His 2016 book Lasting Impact: One Team One Season. What Happens When Our Sons Play Football explores the benefits and dangers of playing football in light of increased concussion awareness. 

Kennedy's latest book, True: The Four Seasons of Jackie Robinson, is to be published in April 2022, by St. Martin's Press.

Bibliography
Pete Rose: An American Dilemma (2014)
Winner of the Casey Award for Best Baseball Book
Named one of Fortune Magazine’s Favorite Books of 2014
56: Joe DiMaggio and the Last Magic Number in Sports (2011)
Winner of the Casey Award for Best Baseball Book
Runner-up PEN/ESPN Award for Literary Sports Writing
Named Best Biography at the San Francisco Book Festival

Editor
Sports Illustrated’s Super Bowl Gold: 50 Years of the Big Game (2015)
Sports Illustrated Swimsuit: 50 Years of Beautiful (2013)
Sports Illustrated’s The Hockey Book (2010)

References

External links
Official website
Spitball Magazine   Spitball magazine. Lists Casey Award winners, and biographical information
Opinion | Give Rose a Shot at the Hall  Give Rose a Shot at The Hall, New York Times Op-Ed
Joe DiMaggio Is Untouchable
San Francisco Book Festival  Winners list, 2011, San Francisco book Festival
2012 PEN/ESPN Award for Literary Sports Writing  PEN/ESPN runner-up 2012

1967 births
Living people
American sportswriters
Stony Brook University alumni
Columbia University Graduate School of Journalism alumni